The 2019–20 season was Club Atlético Osasuna's 89th season in existence and the club's most recent season in the top flight of Spanish football. In addition to the domestic league, Osasuna participated in this season's edition of the Copa del Rey. The season was slated to cover a period from 1 July 2019 to 30 June 2020. It was extended extraordinarily beyond 30 June due to the COVID-19 pandemic in Spain.

Players

Current squad

Out on loan

Transfers

In

Out

Pre-season and friendlies

Competitions

Overview

La Liga

League table

Results summary

Results by round

Matches
The La Liga schedule was announced on 4 July 2019.

Copa del Rey

Statistics

Appearances and goals
Last updated on the end of the season.

|-
! colspan=14 style=background:#dcdcdc; text-align:center|Goalkeepers

|-
! colspan=14 style=background:#dcdcdc; text-align:center|Defenders

|-
! colspan=14 style=background:#dcdcdc; text-align:center|Midfielders

|-
! colspan=14 style=background:#dcdcdc; text-align:center|Forwards

|-
! colspan=14 style=background:#dcdcdc; text-align:center| Players who have made an appearance or had a squad number this season but have left the club

|-
|}

References

External links

CA Osasuna seasons
CA Osasuna